Variety Tonight was a CBC Radio show which aired from 1980 until 1984 at 8-10 PM. Variety Tonight was a nightly series featuring jazz and pop music as well as trivia games, book and movie reviews and interviews. The show was hosted by David Cole (1980–81) followed by Vicki Gabereau.

External links
 Variety Tonight

CBC Radio One programs